In R v Bournewood Community and Mental Health NHS Trust the House of Lords ruled that a man who had been admitted to a psychiatric hospital without capable consent had not been unlawfully detained under the common law.  A later European Court of Human Rights ruling, however, found that the man had been unlawfully deprived of his liberty in the meaning of Article 5 of the European Convention on Human Rights.

Facts 
HL was an adult male who was autistic and had profound learning disabilities.  He had lived in Bournewood Hospital from the age of 13 for over thirty years.  In 1994 he was discharged into the community to live in an adult foster placement with carers Mr and Mrs 'E'.  On 22 July 1997 HL became agitated at a day centre he attended and was admitted to the Accident and Emergency Department at Bournewood Hospital under sedation.  Due to the sedative, HL was compliant and did not resist admission, so doctors chose not to admit him using powers of detention under the Mental Health Act.  HL never attempted to leave the hospital, but his carers were prevented from visiting him in order to prevent him leaving with them.  A report by the Health Service Ombudsman heard evidence from a range of professionals that the standard of HL's care had been poor in the hospital, and he had become distressed and agitated.  Mr and Mrs 'E' sought from the court a judicial review of the decision of the Bournewood Community and Mental Health NHS Trust "to detain the appellant on 22 July 1997 and the Trust's ongoing decision to continue the Appellant's retention" and a writ of Habeas Corpus Ad Subjiciendum to direct that HL be discharged and returned to their care.

Judgment

Appeals
In the High Court the judge considered whether HL had been unlawfully detained under the common law.  He reasoned that 'there will be no restraint of the applicant until he has attempted to leave and the respondent, by its agent, has done something to prevent this'.  The Court of Appeal, however, held that the actions of the Trust had been based on a false premise that they were 'entitled to treat L as an in-patient without his consent as long as he did not dissent'.  The court held that HL should have been detained under the Mental Health Act 1983, as the common law only provided for situations not already encompassed by statute.  The Court also commented that a troubling feature of the appeal was that the respondent Trust was not alone in misinterpreting the Act, and potentially the judgement could apply to many patients informally detained like HL.  They stated that the practice of informal detention in cases like HL could not justify disregarding the Act, especially in light of this bypassing its safeguards to detained patients.

House of Lords
The House of Lords considered whether HL had been unlawfully detained under the common law.  They heard evidence that the ruling of the Court of Appeal might mean several tens of thousands of patients would have to be detained under the Mental Health Act.  They considered that this might excessively stigmatise informal patients and have dire resource implications due to the costs of administering the Mental Health Act.  In assessing whether HL had been detained, they concluded by a majority verdict that he had not been detained in the meaning of the common law tort of false imprisonment because there must be actual and not just potential restraint to engage the tort.  Some commentators have suggested this reasoning might be at odds with other false imprisonment precedents.  Lord Steyn dissented from this aspect of the judgement, stating that the Trust's argument that HL, not being formally detained, was always free to go 'stretched credulity to breaking point' and was 'a fairytale'.  Unanimously their Lordships also held that even if HL had been found to have been detained, it would have been justified under the common law doctrine of necessity.  Although concurring with this finding, Lord Steyn commented that this was an 'unfortunate' result as it left compliant but incapacitated patients without the safeguards of patients detained formally under the Mental Health Act.

European Court of Human Rights

Although HL was in fact released back into the care of Mr. and Mrs. E in December 1997 after being held in hospital for five months, the case was pursued at the European Court of Human Rights(ECtHR) for a declaration that HL had been deprived of his liberty unlawfully in the meaning of Article 5 of the European Convention on Human Rights ('the Convention').  The ECtHR concurred with Lord Steyn that HL had in fact been detained, finding that the distinction relied upon by the House of Lords between actual and potential restraint was not 'of central importance under the Convention'.  They further found that the common law doctrine of necessity did not provide the requisite safeguards for informal detention of compliant but incapacitated patients to be described as 'in accordance with a procedure described by law' as required under Article 5(1)(e).

Response of the UK government to 'the Bournewood judgment'
Following the ruling of the ECtHR, the UK government launched a widespread consultation about the potential consequences of 'the Bournewood judgment', as it became known.  During this consultation it was considered that compliant but incapacitated adults in care homes, as well as hospitals, might be deprived of their liberty in the meaning of the Convention.  This consultation resulted in the amendment of the Mental Capacity Act 2005 to contain the 'deprivation of liberty safeguards'.  The deprivation of liberty safeguards were intended to plug the 'Bournewood gap' by providing administrative and judicial safeguards for adults who lack mental capacity who are deprived of their liberty in care homes and hospitals.  The safeguards came into force in April 2009, but their uptake has not been as widespread as expected and their implementation has been subject to criticism from a wide range of interested parties.

See also
 False imprisonment
 European Convention on Human Rights
 HL v UK (2004)
 Mental Capacity Act 2005
 Mental Health Act 1983
 Mental Health Act 2007

Notes

External links
 Judgment of the Court of Appeal
 Judgment of the House of Lords
 Judgment of the European Court of Human Rights
 The 'Bournewood' consultation
 The deprivation of liberty safeguards code of practice
 The Mental Health Alliance Report on the deprivation of liberty safeguards
 Short film about the Bournewood judgment by the Equality and Human Rights Commission
European Court of Human Rights cases involving the United Kingdom
Mental health legal history of the United Kingdom
Mental health law in the United Kingdom
Mental health case law